The Movement for Dignity and Independence, usually shortened as "MODIN", was an Argentine political party, led by the former Carapintada Aldo Rico. It became the third most voted party in the 1993 legislative elections. They ended in the fourth place the following year, during the elections for the 1994 constituent assembly. The party split up in 1995, and in 2010 changed its name to Partido del Campo Popular.

References

Defunct political parties in Argentina
Political parties established in 1991
1991 establishments in Argentina
Political parties disestablished in 2010
2010 disestablishments in Argentina